Barney Augustus Eaton was a politician in Wisconsin.

Biography
Eaton was born on October 29, 1853 in the town of Lake, Wisconsin. He would become a fruit farmer.

Political career
Eaton was a member of the Wisconsin State Assembly from 1895 to 1898, and later the Wisconsin State Senate from 1899 to 1907. Additionally, he had been President of the village of Cudahy, Wisconsin from 1895 to 1896, and President of the Cudahy School Board in 1895. He also served as the director of the Lake Fire Insurance Company for six years. He was a Republican.

He died on January 8, 1936, in Milwaukee. He is buried in Forest Home Cemetery, in Milwaukee.

References

External links
The Political Graveyard

People from Cudahy, Wisconsin
Mayors of places in Wisconsin
School board members in Wisconsin
Republican Party Wisconsin state senators
Republican Party members of the Wisconsin State Assembly
Businesspeople from Wisconsin
Farmers from Wisconsin
1853 births
1936 deaths
Burials in Wisconsin